The Commonwealth of Virginia has a spectrum of skateparks, from large parks with high budgets and designs that draw attention from the action sports community across the Mid-Atlantic to smaller DIY skateparks.

History of Skateparks in Virginia 
It is hard to provide an exact number of skateparks that exist in Virginia, as skateparks in Virginia have taken many forms of development. As action sports (specifically skateboarding) exploded in popularity in the mid-1990's, enthusiasts didn't wait for the approval and financial support of their cities and counties. Do-it-yourself affairs led the charge of some of the first skateparks in many municipalities. However, even as communities have developed more public skateparks, building DIY skateparks has remained a significant aspect of the culture in the Virginia action sports community, it is not uncommon for areas to have multiple government-funded, public skateparks and DIY skateparks within the same areas. The City of Richmond is a great example of this, as there are multiple public skateparks in the area; in addition, the DIY affairs of the action sports community became so popular that Richmond Parks and Recreation gave land to the Richmond Area Skateboard Alliance to pursue the legal development of a DIY skatepark in the Texas Beach area of the city.

A few of the newest publicly funded skateparks throughout Virginia boast modern design techniques and the sheer acreage to make them noteworthy on an international scale. The Charlottesville Skatepark, the Woodstock Skatepark in Virginia Beach, and the Powhatan Springs Skate Park in Arlington, VA are a few of these contemporary skateparks that sit at the top of the list for anyone looking to explore the skateparks of Virginia.

According to USA Today, one can skate "any season of the year at several indoor and outdoor parks across Virginia with a wide range of elements and levels of difficulty." Indoor skateparks have been an extremely significant development for action sports enthusiasts. Virginia's climate invariably presents weather that can hinder people's ability to enjoy outdoor skateparks consistently throughout the year. The humid, hot days of summer, the frigid temperatures of winter, and the rainy periods that come and go all present obstacles for those looking to progress their skills. Throughout the 2010s, many of the indoor skateparks closed. As of 2021, Liberty Mountain Skatepark in Lynchburg, Virginia and Mekos Skatepark in Hampton, Virginia are the only two public indoor facilities that are still operating.

Virginia Skate Park Directory

See also
List of skateparks (world-wide)

References

Sports in Virginia